Miss Northern Ireland is a national beauty pageant in Northern Ireland, run by Alison Clarke.

History
Before 1999, the winner of Miss Northern Ireland would have to compete in the Miss United Kingdom competition and win it in order to be applicable to compete in the Miss World competition. Since then however, the winner of each nation of the UK sends separate representatives to the Miss World pageant, the highest ranking of the four delegates is then named Miss United Kingdom, and competes at the Miss International Pageant the following year under the "Britain" or "United Kingdom" banner.

Titleholders
Color key

2000 to Present
Since 2000, winners of Miss Northern Ireland have been competing in the Miss World pageant.

1980 to 1999

See also 
 Miss Universe Ireland
 Miss Ireland

References

Lists of people from Northern Ireland
Northern Ireland
Northern Ireland
Culture of Northern Ireland
Miss Northern Ireland
Annual events in Northern Ireland
Awards of Northern Ireland
Recurring events established in 1980
1980 establishments in Northern Ireland